Por amor o por dinero (English: For Love or For Money) is an American Spanish-language dating reality show produced by Acun Medya for Telemundo. The series was announced on October 19, 2021. It premiered on November 17, 2021, on Telemundo.

Format 
The reality shows follows 16 single contestants, eight women and eight men, living in an isolated tropical paradise. The contestants must pair up, whether it be for love or money, and compete in mental and physical challenges. Through the season the contestants must re-couple when they can choose either to remain in their current couple or swap partner. The participants who remain single are eliminated. The overall winning couple, chosen by viewers vote, will split the $200,000 cash price.

Participants

Coupling and elimination history

Episodes

Ratings 
 
}}

Notes

References 

2020s American reality television series
2021 American television series debuts
2022 American television series endings
American dating and relationship reality television series
Telemundo original programming
Spanish-language television shows